The Coogee Dolphins was formed in October 1993 under the auspices of the Eastern Suburbs Junior League but now affiliated with the South Sydney District Junior Rugby Football League. The club's colors are gold and blue. Coogee Dolphins also compete for the Remembrance Cup to honor six Coogee Dolphins players who were killed in the Bali Bombings in 2002

See also

References

External links
 

Rugby league teams in Sydney
Rugby clubs established in 1993
1993 establishments in Australia
Coogee, New South Wales